Sir David Craig Carter  (born 1 September 1940) is a surgeon who was Chief Medical Officer for Scotland from 1996–2000.

Early life and education
Carter was born on 1 September 1940 to Mary Florence (née Lister) and Horace Ramsay Carter. He attended Cockermouth Grammar School, and went on to study medicine at the University of St Andrews, graduating with an MB ChB in 1964 and continuing on to receive his MD.

Surgeon
He was St Mungo Professor of Surgery at the University of Glasgow from 1979 to 1988. He then became the Regius Professor of Clinical Surgery at the University of Edinburgh.

He was appointed the Chief Medical Officer for Scotland in 1996 and continued in this role until 2000, when he was succeeded by Mac Armstrong.

Carter was the Honorary President of the British Medical Association from 2001–02, vice-president of the Royal Society of Edinburgh 2000-03.

Honours and awards
He was awarded a Knight Bachelor for services to medicine in the 1996 New Year Honours.

In 2007, the Royal Society of Edinburgh honoured him by making him a Royal Medallist.

In 2010, he received an honorary DSc from the University of Hull.

References

External links
 profile (former staff member) at University of Edinburgh's research explorer

Living people
1940 births
Chief Medical Officers for Scotland
20th-century Scottish medical doctors
Scottish surgeons
Academics of the University of Edinburgh
Academics of the University of Glasgow
Alumni of the University of Dundee
Fellows of the Royal College of Surgeons of Edinburgh
Knights Bachelor
20th-century surgeons